In music a fourth is an interval spanning four staff positions in the musical notation common in Western culture.

Specific fourth intervals include:
 Perfect fourth, the fourth spanning five semitones
 Diminished fourth, a perfect fourth narrowed by a chromatic semitone, thus spanning four semitones
 Augmented fourth or tritone, an interval of three adjacent whole tones (six semitones)

In addition, fourth in music may refer to:
 Quartal harmony, harmonic structures built from the perfect fourth, the augmented fourth and the diminished fourth
 Subdominant, the fourth tonal degree of the diatonic scale